Life in a Minor Key is musical artist Chris Braide's second studio album.

David A. Stewart's label Anxious Records signed Chris Braide in London, United Kingdom, It was Braide's second solo album.

On the liner notes of the reissued limited edition vinyl David A. Stewarts  writes:
"I met Chris Braide in London when he was only 24 years old, yet he was so mature as a songwriter and a consummate musician. Chris could sing and play any of his songs effortlessly on piano or guitar and he and I spent many days and weeks at Church Studios experimenting amongst the vortex of creative chaos that tends to surround me and I could see that Chris was soaking up everything and enjoying being amongst lots of other crazy artists. Chris could sing like a bird and he also could attract a lot of birds too! He had the whole package………..amazing musician, great songwriter, fantastic voice and if that wasn’t enough he looked like a young Marc Bolan! So after a while I marched him off to Greenwich village in NYC where I bought him a silver glitter guitar and we spent time in the Jimi Hendrix Studio Electric Lady where in the early hours of the morning we staggered out with a great album. I hope you enjoy listening to it as much as I enjoyed making it!" Dave Stewart, Los Angeles, 2012

Braide recorded the album at Electric Lady Studios, New York, The Church Studio, London UK and Miraval Studios, France.

Two singles were released from the album including the opening track "If I Hadn’t Got You", and "Heavenly Rain".

The video for "If I Hadn’t Got You" was directed by Zanna and filmed at The Ragged School in London.

The video for "Heavenly Rain" was filmed in New Orleans.

Craig Kallman heard Chris perform at a showcase in London and signed him to Atlantic Records. The single release of "If I Hadn’t Got You" was accompanied by a new video filmed in Times Square.

The album was reissued on limited edition red vinyl by  label Plane Groovy Records in 2013.

Track listing
All songs written by Chris Braide except for "If I Hadn’t Got You" and "Out of The Blue" written by Chris Braide and Chris Difford

 "If I Hadn’t Got You" – 4:34
 " Heavenly Rain " – 4:23
 "The Choice is Yours" – 4:13
 "Life in a Minor Key" – 4:33
 "Summer Fever" – 4:20
 "Suffer for Love" – 3:47
 "Out of the Blue" – 3:50
 "Beautiful Things" – 3:48
 "She Still Sings" – 5:06
 "If I Hadn't Got You Reprise" – 0:47

Personnel
Chris Braide - vocals, (Grand Piano), keyboards, Producer
David A. Stewart- Producer
Bob Rosa - mixing 
Phil Bodger - mixing
Gota Yashiki- drums
Caroline Dale and London Metropolitan Orchestra String Arrangement
Patrick Howley - electric guitar 
Karen Poole – backing vocals
Karen Cox – backing vocals
Zhana Saunders - backing vocals
 Ramona Keller - backing vocals
Bernie Worrell - wah clav and Hammond organ
Zanna – Photography and Art Direction
Marissa Hine– Stylist
Stacey Kelly– Make-up

References

External links

1998 albums
Chris Braide albums
Albums produced by David A. Stewart